Maurice B. Clark (1827–1901) was a partner in a produce business with John D. Rockefeller Sr, along with Clark's two brothers, James and Richard. Clark was from Malmesbury, England and moved to the United States in 1847. He studied with Rockefeller at Folsom's Commercial College in Ohio.

His business career began with the firm of Otis & Sinclair. He went on partner with John Rockefeller in 1856, forming a grain and produce business that grew with the addition of several other partners to be Clark, Rockefeller, & Co in 1864.
During the American Civil War (1863), the two partners went into the oil business. Eventually, Rockefeller bought Clark's (and his brothers') share of the company at auction for $72,500. Following this, Clark went on to start another oil company, the Star Oil company, which passed through several names and changes of partner, becoming Clark Brothers & Co, and Clark, Payne, & Co. In 1868, he joined new partners to form the Clark, Schurmer, & Scofield Company, which then became Clark, Scofield, and Teagle. Following his work in the oil industry, he helped to organize the Cleveland Co-operative Stove Company. At the time of his death, he presided over the board of directors and he had been the company's president for twenty years.

In addition to his work in the business community, he served one term in the City Council of Cleveland, representing the "old fourth ward" from 1872 to 1873. He was also a prominent abolitionist, and one of the charter members of the First Wesleyan Methodist Church, known for its abolitionist outlook.

References

 Titan: The Life of John D. Rockefeller, Sr., Ron Chernow, Random House, 1998.

People from Malmesbury
1827 births
1901 deaths
19th-century American businesspeople